Milium (vernacular name milletgrass) is a genus of Eurasian, North American, and North African plants in the grass family.

 Species
 Milium atropatanum Maroofi - Iran
 Milium effusum   - eastern + central Canada; northeastern + north-central United States; Eurasia + North Africa from Iceland + Spain to Taiwan + Kamchatka
 Milium pedicellare (Bornm.) Roshev. ex Melderis - Middle East
 Milium schmidtianum  - Turkey, Iran, Caucasus
 Milium transcaucasicum  - Transcaucasus
 Milium vernale  - Eurasia + North Africa from France + Morocco to Kazakhstan; naturalized in Idaho

 Formerly included
many species once included in Milium but now considered better suited to other genera: Achnatherum, Aeluropus, Agrostis, Airopsis, Alloteropsis, Amphicarpum, Aniselytron, Anthaenantia, Antinoria, Apera, Arundinella, Axonopus, Brachiaria, Cynodon, Digitaria, Echinochloa, Eriochloa, Eriocoma, Gastridium, Homolepis, Ichnanthus, Isachne, Luziola, Muhlenbergia, Nassella, Oplismenus, Oryzopsis, Panicum, Paspalum, Pentameris, Piptatherum, Piptochaetium, Poa, Polypogon, Sorghum, Sporobolus, Trachypogon, Tricholaena, Triplachne, Zingeria and Zoysia.

References

Pooideae
Poaceae genera
Taxa named by Carl Linnaeus